Claude Neveu was a French slalom canoeist who competed from the late 1940s to the late 1950s. He won six medals at the ICF Canoe Slalom World Championships with five golds (C-2: 1951, 1955; C-2 team: 1949, 1951, 1953) and a silver (C-2: 1949).

References

Year of birth missing
Year of death missing 
French male canoeists
Medalists at the ICF Canoe Slalom World Championships